The SaskTel Tankard is the Saskatchewan provincial championship for men's curling. The tournament is run by CURLSASK, the provincial curling association. The winner represents Team Saskatchewan at the Tim Hortons Brier. It is also known as the SaskTel Provincial Men's Championship. SaskTel became the sponsor in 2004 when it was known as the SaskTel Mobility Tankard.

Past names
Macdonald Tankard (1927–1979)
Labatt Tankard (1980–1994)
Saskatchewan Wheat Pool Tankard (1995–2003)
SaskTel Mobility Tankard (2004–2006)
SaskTel Tankard (2007–present)

Qualification
The SaskTel Tankard Provincial Championship is a 16 team seeded Triple Knockout format with a Page System Playoff.

The 16 teams qualify as follows:
 The SaskTel Tankard Southern and Northern Playdown each declare six teams. 
 One berth will be awarded to the highest ranked registered Saskatchewan Team from the Saskatchewan Curling Tour (SCT). 
 Four berths will be awarded to the two highest ranked registered Saskatchewan Teams from the CTRS ranking. 
 One berth is awarded to the SaskTour Players' Championship 
 Four berths will be awarded from SCT provincial berth bonspiels.

At the provincial final, the A Event winner, B Event winner and the two finalists of the C Event advance to the Page System Playoff.

Champions

Notes

References

External links
List of champions

The Brier provincial tournaments
Curling in Saskatchewan